Jeremy Rashaad Carter (born October 18, 1989) is an American football wide receiver who is currently a free agent. He played college football at Tusculum College.

Early years
He attended Stephenson High School in Stone Mountain, Georgia. He was selected to 2006 All-County and All-Region teams and also was the 2006 Offensive Player of the Year.

College career
He was named to the Consensus Draft Services Preseason All-American and was selected to the Preseason All-South Atlantic Conference First-team.

Professional career

Baltimore Ravens
On May 13, 2013, he signed with the Baltimore Ravens as an undrafted free agent. On August 25, 2013, he was waived by the Ravens.

Spokane Shock
On February 20, 2014, Carter was assigned to the Spokane Shock of the Arena Football League (AFL).

After an injury to the Shock's starting quarterback Erik Meyer, Carter was pressed into service as the Shock's quarterback during the May 4, 2014 contest against the LA KISS.

Portland Steel
On November 5, 2015, Carter was assigned to the Portland Thunder. The team was later renamed the Steel.

Cleveland Gladiators
On October 14, 2016, Carter was assigned to the Cleveland Gladiators during the dispersal draft. He was placed on reassignment on March 8, 2017.

Spokane Empire
On June 7, 2017, Carter signed with the Spokane Empire of the Indoor Football League.

Richmond Roughriders
On February 6, 2018, Carter signed with the Richmond Roughriders of the American Arena League.

References

External links
Tusculum Pioneers bio 
Baltimore Ravens bio

Living people
1989 births
American football wide receivers
Tusculum Pioneers football players
Baltimore Ravens players
Spokane Shock players
Portland Thunder players
Portland Steel players
Cleveland Gladiators players
Spokane Empire players
Players of American football from Atlanta
American Arena League players